The 2018–19 Marist Red Foxes women's basketball team represented Marist College during the 2018–19 NCAA Division I women's basketball season. The Red Foxes were led by 17th-year head coach Brian Giorgis, and played their home games at the McCann Arena as members of the Metro Atlantic Athletic Conference. They finished the regular season 23–10 overall, 13–5 in MAAC play to finish third place. As a No. 3 seed in the 2019 MAAC tournament, they advanced to the championship game and were defeated by No. 1 seed Quinnipiac 51–81.

Previous season
The Red Foxes finished the 2017–18 season 20–14, 14–4 in MAAC play to finish in second place. As the No. 2 seed at the MAAC tournament, they defeated No. 7 seed Manhattan and No. 3 seed Siena to advance to the championship game, where they lost to top-seeded Quinnipiac. They were invited to the 2018 Women's National Invitation Tournament where they lost in the first round at St. John's 47–68.

Roster

Schedule

|-
!colspan=9 style=| Non-conference regular season

|-
!colspan=9 style=| MAAC Regular season

|-
!colspan=9 style=| MAAC Women's Tournament

See also
 2018–19 Marist Red Foxes men's basketball team

References

Marist Red Foxes women's basketball seasons
Marist